The ICA IS-29 was a sailplane built in Romania in the 1970s. The prefix IS comes from Iosif Șilimon, the Romanian IAR (Industria Aeronautică Română) aeronautical engineer who designed it.

Design and development
The 15-metre (49ft 3in) single-seat variant of the IS-28 series, the IS-29D2 single-seater has retractable gear, camber-changing flaps and Hütter-type airbrakes on the upper wing surface only. The T-tail has a fixed stabilizer and elevator. The –29D model is of all-metal construction while the earlier –29B has wooden wings. Developments include 19 metre (62 ft) -29E2 and 20 metre (66 ft) -29E3 versions and a flapless, fixed gear 16.5-metre (54 feet) ‘club’ model -29G.

The IS-29 was also produced in a motorglider version, designated the IS-29EM. This shared the low-set wings and three-point undercarriage of the IS-28M2, and the new wings of the IS-28MA.

Variants
 IS-29
 IS-29B - wooden wings of 15-metre span
 IS-29D
 IS-29D2
 IS-29D2 Club - Club-class version of IS-29D2
 IS-29E - open class version with ballast tanks
 IS-29E2 - version with 19-metre wings
 IS-29E3 - version with 20-metre wings
 IS-29EM - motorglider version
 IS-29G - Club-class version with 16.5-metre wings
 IS-31 - IS-29 with 20-metre wings and linked flaps and ailerons
 IS-33 - IS-29 with tanks for 150 kg (300 lb) of water ballast

Specifications (IS-29D2)

See also

Notes

Citations

Bibliography
 Soaring Society of America
 
 
 
 
 

1970s Romanian sailplanes
ICA aircraft
Aircraft first flown in 1970
T-tail aircraft
Shoulder-wing aircraft